Stephen Monty (born 30 March 1963) is an Australian cricketer. He played in eleven first-class and four List A matches for Queensland between 1990 and 1992.

See also
 List of Queensland first-class cricketers

References

External links
 

1963 births
Living people
Australian cricketers
Queensland cricketers
Cricketers from Adelaide